The Wild Sky Wilderness is a  wilderness area in the western Cascade Range of Washington state.  The wilderness is within the Mount Baker-Snoqualmie National Forest north of the U.S. Highway 2 towns of Index and Skykomish.  The wilderness flanks, but does not include, the North Fork Skykomish River and the Beckler River.  The Henry M. Jackson Wilderness is adjacent to the east and northeast. The highest point in Wild Sky Wilderness is 6,244 foot Gunn Peak.

Until 2014 with the expansion of the Alpine Lakes Wilderness by President Obama, the Wild Sky Wilderness was significant because it was the first new federally designated wilderness in Washington since 1984.  Also, unlike many other wilderness areas in the Cascades, Wild Sky protects significant amounts of high productivity low-elevation forest.

Legislative history
The Wild Sky Wilderness required several legislative attempts before becoming law, despite broad local support.  Prior to 2007, the Wild Sky bill was blocked in committee by Representative Richard Pombo of California, who was not reelected in 2006.  President George W. Bush had been receptive to the proposal.

In February 2007, Senator Patty Murray and Rep. Rick Larsen introduced legislation to designate the Wild Sky as wilderness.  The bill then passed the House and had been approved by the Senate Energy and Natural Resources Committee.  Before the bill came to the Senate floor, however, it was put on hold by Oklahoma Republican Tom Coburn, and never reached a vote.

The Consolidated Natural Resources Act of 2008, creating the Wild Sky Wilderness, was passed by the U.S. Senate on April 10, 2008, and then passed the U.S. House of Representatives a little less than three weeks later on April 29.  President Bush signed the Wilderness into law on May 8, 2008.

Private land
Since 2003 the Wilderness Land Trust and Cascade Land Conservancy have purchased about one-third of this amount. Efforts continue to acquire the remaining inholdings.

See also
 List of U.S. Wilderness Areas

References

 Associated Press, "Nethercutt endorses Wild Sky wilderness", Seattle Post-Intelligencer, May 15, 2004
 Goldfarb, Sam, "Wild Sky wilderness bill back in Congress", The Seattle Times, February 7, 2007

External links
 The Wild Sky Wilderness Proposal, Washington Wild (political advocacy)
 Wild Sky Wilderness, U.S. Senator Patty Murray (political advocacy)
 The Wilderness Land Trust

IUCN Category Ib
Protected areas of King County, Washington
Protected areas of Snohomish County, Washington
Wilderness areas of Washington (state)
Mount Baker-Snoqualmie National Forest